The Denham Springs Collegiate Institute was a school founded by a group of Denham Springs, Louisiana residents in 1895.  

The Institute included a large meeting hall and a smaller wooden framed building. It had a four-year curriculum.   The Institute was located on the site of the existing First Presbyterian Church on North College Drive.

In 1908, the board gave the Institute buildings and its property to the Denham Springs public school system.  Shortly thereafter, a two-story brick building was erected on the same site. This was the beginning of Denham Springs High School.

References

External links
MAP
360 degree photo of area near original site
Southeastern Louisiana University, Carter Plantation collection has copies of Annual Catalogue, 1897-98, (2 copies)

Defunct schools in Louisiana
Education in Livingston Parish, Louisiana